Charles-Theodore-Henri De Coster (20 August 1827 – 7 May 1879) was a Belgian novelist whose efforts laid the basis for a native Belgian literature.

Early life and education
He was born in Munich; his father, Augustin De Coster, was a native of Liège, who was attached to the household of the Apostolic Nuncio to Bavaria in Munich, but soon returned to Belgium. Charles was placed in a Brussels bank, but in 1850 he entered the Université libre de Bruxelles, where he completed his studies in 1855. He was one of the founders of the Société des Joyeux, a small literary club, more than one member of which was to achieve literary distinction.

De Coster made his debut as a poet in the Revue trimestrielle, founded in 1854, and his first efforts in prose were contributed to a periodical entitled Uylenspiegel (founded 1856). A correspondence covering the years 1850 to 1858, his Lettres à Elisa, were edited by Charles Potvin in 1894.

He was a keen student of François Rabelais and Michel de Montaigne, and familiarized himself with 16th-century French. He said that Flemish manners and speech could not be rendered faithfully in modern French, and accordingly wrote his best works in the old tongue. The success of his Légendes flamandes (1856) was increased by the illustrations of Félicien Rops and other friends. In 1861 he published his Contes brabançons, in modern French.

Career
His masterpiece was The Legend of Thyl Ulenspiegel and Lamme Goedzak (1867), a 16th-century romance, which was barely read in Belgium because it did not meet up to the conventional standard of Belgian nationalism, but became popular over the rest of the world. In the preparation for this prose epic of the Gueux he spent some ten years. Uylenspiegel (Eulenspiegel) has been compared to Don Quixote, and even to Panurge. He is the type of the 16th-century Fleming, and the history of his resurrection from the grave itself was accepted as an allegory of the destiny of the race. The exploits of himself and his friend form the thread of a semihistorical narrative, full of racy humour, in spite of the barbarities that find a place in it. This book also was illustrated by Félicien Rops and others.

In 1876 De Coster introduced Xavier Mellery to the island of Marken asking him to deliver drawings for the Tour du Monde magazine.

In 1870 De Coster became professor of general history and of French literature at the military school. His works however were not financially profitable; in spite of his government employment he was always in difficulties; and he died in much discouragement in May 1878 at Ixelles, Brussels and was interred there in the Ixelles Cemetery.

The expensive form in which Uylenspiegel was produced made it open only to a limited class of readers, and when a new and cheap edition in modern French appeared in 1893 it was received practically as a new book in France and Belgium. He was a freemason, and a member of the lodge Les Vrais Amis de l'Union et du Progrès Réunis of the Grand Orient of Belgium, where he was initiated on 7 January 1858.

The Legend of Thyl Ulenspiegel and Lamme Goedzak was illustrated by Nicolas Eekman in 1946.

Bibliography
 Style et archaïsme dans 'La Légende d'Ulenspiegel' de Charles De Coster, Jeeeen-Marie Klinkenberg, Bruxelles, Palais des Académies, 1973.
 Charles De Coster, Jean-Marie Klinkenberg, Bruxelles, Labor, 1985

References

External links

 
 
 Charles De Coster (Dutch)
 P. Barenboim, B. Meshcheryakov — Flanders in Moscow and Odessa:: poet Eduard Bagritskii (Bagritsky) as the Till Ulenspiegel of Russian literature.

19th-century Belgian novelists
19th-century Belgian male writers
Belgian male novelists
Belgian poets in French
Belgian Freemasons
1827 births
1879 deaths
Burials at Ixelles Cemetery
Till Eulenspiegel
19th-century Belgian poets
Belgian male poets
Historical novelists
Writers of historical fiction set in the early modern period